José María Covarrubias y Mejía (born 1826 in Querétaro City) was a Mexican clergyman and bishop for the Roman Catholic Archdiocese of Antequera, Oaxaca. He was ordained in 1839. He was appointed bishop in 1861. He died in 1867.

References 

1826 births
1867 deaths
Mexican Roman Catholic bishops
People from Querétaro City